Jackson Conway (born December 3, 2001) is an American professional soccer player who plays as a forward for USL Championship club Phoenix Rising on loan from Major League Soccer club Atlanta United.

Career
Conway played with Atlanta United academy while also appearing for Atlanta's USL Championship affiliate Atlanta United 2 during their inaugural season in 2018. On December 20, 2018, Conway signed his first professional contract with Atlanta United 2.

On December 3, 2020, Conway signed a homegrown player deal with Major League Soccer club Atlanta United. Conway made his debut for Atlanta United on December 16, 2020 coming off the bench against Club América in the CONCACAF Champions League, scoring the game winning goal in a 1–0 victory. On July 8, 2021, Conway scored his first Major League Soccer goal, an equalizer in Atlanta's 2–2 draw against Nashville SC.

On March 29, 2022, Conway was named USL Championship Player of the Week for Week 3 of the 2022 season. Conway earned the award after scoring the 100th hat trick in USL Championship history, part of a 4-1 victory for Atlanta United 2 over the Charleston Battery.

Career statistics

References

External links

2001 births
Living people
American soccer players
Association football forwards
Atlanta United 2 players
Atlanta United FC players
Phoenix Rising FC players
English expatriate footballers
English expatriates in the United States
Footballers from Leeds
Homegrown Players (MLS)
Soccer players from Atlanta
United States men's youth international soccer players
USL Championship players
Major League Soccer players